= Guayamba =

Coordinates: 28°21′S 65°25′W

G uayamba
- Municipality and village
- Interactive map of G uayamba
- Country: Argentina
- Province: Catamarca Province
- Time zone: UTC−3 (ART)

Guayamba is a village and municipality in Catamarca Province in northwestern Argentina.
